Scampolo is a 1958 German film directed by Alfred Weidenmann and starring Romy Schneider, Paul Hubschmid, and Georg Thomalla. Schneider plays the title role.

Plot 
Scampolo is a young, poor girl who lives on the island of Ischia. She falls in love with a young architect who hopes to win a design competition. Scampolo intercedes on his behalf with the minister and helps him to make his dream come true.

Cast 
Romy Schneider as Scampolo
Paul Hubschmid as Roberto Costa, architect
Georg Thomalla as Andreas Michaels, fashion photographer
Eva Maria Meineke as Sabina
Franca Parisi as Franca
Peter Carsten as Cesare
Wolfgang Wahl as Baptiste
Elisabeth Flickenschildt as Marietta
Willy Millowitsch as Mayor
Stanislav Ledinek as Flavio
Walter Rilla as Lombardo
Viktor de Kowa as Minister

Production 
The film's sets were designed by the art director Rolf Zehetbauer. Partly shot on location around Naples, the film was made in Agfacolor.

References

External links 

1958 films
West German films
1950s German-language films
Films directed by Alfred Weidenmann
Films set in Italy
Films set on islands
Films set in the Mediterranean Sea
Remakes of German films
UFA GmbH films
1950s German films